Gnome Athletic F.C. was an English football club based in Walthamstow, East London.  Originally the works team of Peter Hooker Limited, which manufactured engines in conjunction with the French Gnôme and Le Rhône Engine Company, the club was formed during the First World War and operated until the mid-1920s, latterly under the names Walthamstow Town and Walthamstow Borough.  The club played in the London League for most of its existence and entered the FA Cup on several occasions.

Players

References

Amateur football clubs in England
Amateur association football teams
 
Defunct football clubs in England
Defunct football clubs in London
Association football clubs disestablished in the 1920s
London League (football)
Works association football teams in England
South Essex League